The Kush is the debut solo album by rapper Havoc of the hip-hop duo Mobb Deep. It was released on September 18, 2007, on Nature Sounds Records. The lead single "I'm the Boss" was released on August 14, 2007. Havoc produced the album's entirety.

The album debuted at number 173 with a bullet on the Billboard 200 chart.

Track listing
All tracks produced by Havoc

References

External links
[ The Kush] at Allmusic

2007 albums
Albums produced by Havoc (musician)
Havoc (musician) albums
Nature Sounds albums